Oreopteris is a genus of ferns belonging to the family Thelypteridaceae.

The species of this genus are found in Eurasia and Northern America.

Species:
 Oreopteris elwesii (Baker ex Hook. & Baker) Holttum 
 Oreopteris limbosperma (All.) Holub

References

Thelypteridaceae
Fern genera